The Buffalo River, a perennial river of the North-East Murray catchment of the Murray-Darling basin, is located in the Alpine region of Victoria, Australia.

Location and features
The east and west branches of the river reach their confluence within the Mount Buffalo National Park, where the watercourse becomes the Buffalo River. The river flows generally north, much of its course through the remote national park, joined by nine tributaries including the Catherine River and the Dandongadale River, before reaching its confluence with the Ovens River west of the town of Myrtleford and adjacent to the Great Alpine Road. The river descends  over its  course.

The river is impounded by the Buffalo Dam that creates the  reservoir, called Lake Buffalo, that was completed in 1965 and supplies potable water to Myrtleford and irrigation of the Goulburn Valley.

See also

References

North-East catchment
Rivers of Hume (region)